Beatriz Marbella Corella Sías (born September 14, 1988, in Caborca, Sonora, Mexico), better known as Marbella Corella, is a Mexican singer who gained fame by coming 3rd place in the hit reality show La Academia.

After spending six months in reality, recipient of third place in the competition was, winning prize of $500, 000.00, and a recording contract with Warner Music. In 2007 launched "Mírame" her first solo album, which collected many of the songs performed at La Academia, plus a DVD of the same; and soon managed to sell more than 30,000 copies in Mexico production and placing in the top 50 of the best selling albums in the country, according to AMPROFON.

In December 2014 she released the single "La que miente en tu cara".

Biography
In 2006, she was selected for the Mexican musical reality TV show La Academia. During this show she sang "Sin él", "Si quieres verme llorar", "Lagrimas y lluvia" and other songs.

Discography

Studio albums
 Mírame (2007)

Compilations
 La Academia Cinco: Vol. 1
 La Academia Cinco: Vol. 2

Collaborations
  La Academia le canta a José Alfredo Jiménez - "Un pedazo de luna"

References

External links

1988 births
Living people
Mexican television personalities
La Academia contestants
Singers from Sonora
21st-century Mexican singers
21st-century Mexican women singers
People from Caborca